FK Balkan was a football club based in the city of Skopje, North Macedonia.

History
The club was founded in 1921.

They played seven seasons in the Macedonian First League and finished third on two occasions, in 1992–93 and 1993–94.

In 2012, the club was dissolved for the financial reasons.

The main club rival was Sloga Jugomagnat, who shared the ground with them.

Honours

Macedonian Republic League:
Winners (1): 1990

Seasons (1992–2000)

References

External links
Club info at MacedonianFootball 
Football Federation of Macedonia Website 

Defunct football clubs in North Macedonia
Football clubs in Skopje
Association football clubs established in 1921
Association football clubs disestablished in 2012
1921 establishments in Yugoslavia
2012 disestablishments in the Republic of Macedonia